Nayak is a 2019 Indian Bhojpuri language action Thriller film released on 6 September 2019 and directed by Ramana Mogili, story screenplay by Rajendra Bharadwaj and Produced by Ramana Rao  on  Rochisri Movies banner. The film stars Pradeep Pandey, Pavani, Nidhija, and Prabhakar in pivotal roles with music was composed by Madhukar Anand.

Plot 
This story is a serious action-love thriller with high intensity. Suraj (Pradeep Pandey) works at  orphanage. He accidentally meets Varsha (Pavani) and falls in love at first sight. Running a raucous empire is Kali Maharaj (Prabhakar). Rudra (Bhupal Raj) is his son. They threaten everyone. They also steal things. Regarding Varsha, Suraj confronts Rudra. Regarding Varsha's aim, Suraj confronts Kali Maharaj. Accepting Suraj's love brings the story to a happy end.

Cast 
Pradeep Pandey as Suraj
Pavani as Varsha
 Prabhakar as Kali Maharaj
Bhupal Raj as Rudra

Music 

Music composed by Madhukar Anand. Music released on Enterr10 Rangeela Music Company. The audio launch held on  20 April 2019

References

External links 
 

2019 films
2010s Bhojpuri-language films